Oswulf was king of Northumbria from 758 to 759. He succeeded his father Eadberht, who had abdicated and joined the monastery at York. Oswulf's uncle was Ecgbert, Archbishop of York.

In spite of his father's long reign, and his powerful uncle, Oswulf did not hold the throne for long. He was murdered within a year of coming to power, by members of his household, by his servants or bodyguards, at Market Weighton, on 24 July 759.

The death of Oswulf's brother, Oswine, is recorded at "Eldunum near Mailros" in August 761, in battle against Æthelwald Moll, who had seized the throne on Oswulf's death.

Further reading
 Higham, N.J., The Kingdom of Northumbria AD 350–1100. Stroud: Sutton, 1993. 
 Marsden, J., Northanhymbre Saga: The History of the Anglo-Saxon Kings of Northumbria. London: Cathie, 1992.

See also
List of monarchs of Northumbria

External links
 

759 deaths
Northumbrian monarchs
8th-century English monarchs
8th-century murdered monarchs
Year of birth unknown
Assassinated royalty
Idings